The 2005 Missouri Valley Conference men's basketball tournament was played from March 4-7, 2005 at the Savvis Center in St. Louis, Missouri at the conclusion of the 2004–2005 regular season. The Creighton Bluejays won their 9th MVC tournament title to earn an automatic bid to the 2005 NCAA tournament.

Tournament Bracket

See also
 Missouri Valley Conference

References 

2004–05 Missouri Valley Conference men's basketball season
Missouri Valley Conference men's basketball tournament